During the 2013–14 English football season, Charlton Athletic competed in the Football League Championship for the second consecutive season.

Squad statistics

Appearances and goals

|}

Top scorers

Disciplinary record

Coaching staff
Until 11 March 2014

From 11 March 2014

Boardroom
Until 3 January 2014

From 3 January 2014

Season statistics

League table

Results summary

Results by round

Fixtures and results

Pre-season

Championship

League Cup

FA Cup

Transfers

In

Out

Loan In

Loan Out

References

Notes

Charlton Athletic F.C. seasons
Charlton Athletic F.C.